For Liouville's equation in differential geometry, see Liouville's equation.
In mathematics, Liouville–Bratu–Gelfand equation or Liouville's equation  is a non-linear Poisson equation, named after the mathematicians Joseph Liouville, G. Bratu and Israel Gelfand. The equation reads

The equation appears in thermal runaway as Frank-Kamenetskii theory, astrophysics for example, Emden–Chandrasekhar equation. This equation also describes space charge of electricity around a glowing wire and describes planetary nebula.

Liouville's solution

In two dimension with Cartesian Coordinates , Joseph Liouville proposed a solution in 1853 as

If , then Walker's solution is

where  is some finite radius. Walker also proposed two more solutions in his 1915 paper.

Radially symmetric forms

If the system to be studied is radially symmetric, then the equation in  dimension becomes

where  is the distance from the origin. With the boundary conditions

For , two solution exists and for  infinitely many solution exists with solutions oscillating about the point .

The solution for  that is valid in the range  is given by

The solution for  that is valid in the range  is given by

References

Equations of physics
Differential equations